Hanunoo is a Unicode block containing characters used for writing the Hanunó'o language. However, this Unicode block also contains the two punctuation marks (᜵, and ᜶) which are unified characters for all the Philippine scripts (Baybayin, Hanunoo, Buhid and Tagbanwa).

History
The following Unicode-related documents record the purpose and process of defining specific characters in the Hanunoo block:

References 

Unicode blocks